DESO is a football club from Oss, Netherlands. Since 2018, the first squad plays in the Sunday Vijfde Klasse.

History 
During the years 2015–17, DESO peaked in the Hoofdklasse. After an incident in the 2017–18 season, it withdrew the first squad from the Eerste Klasse and most other teams from their competitions. Next season, the unlisted DESO teams rejoined at the lowest 
levels.

References

External links
 Official site

Football clubs in the Netherlands
Association football clubs established in 1946
1946 establishments in the Netherlands
Football clubs in Oss